The Gaddi Nashin is the leader of the Ravidass Deras in the Ravidassia religion. The religion's founder Guru Ravidass is worshipped as Guru, and the Gaddi Nashin are considered a messenger of God following the Guru (Spiritual Leader). Only one Gaddi Nashin holds the position at a time, as the highest-ranking member of the religion. Below him are a large number of Ravidassia Sant Samaj who work under the leader, directing and giving instructions relating to affairs and matters of the religion.

The current Gaddi Nashin is Niranjan Dass who has been holding that position since 24 November 2007.

Previous holders 
Pipal Dass (1895 to 1928CE)	
Sarwan Dass (1928 to 1972)
Hari Dass (1972 to 1982)
Garib Dass (1982 to 1994)
Niranjan Dass (current)

Usage by other Sikh & Sufi Muslim sects

The persian origin term Gaddi Nashin, composite of gaddi meaning seat or position (gaddi) and nashin (also spelled nasheen) meaning holder or occupier, means the holder or occupier of a certain position. This term is also used in other sects of Sikhism and Islam. The Sodhi descendants of the heretical Mina sect of Sikhism in Guru Harsahai use the title of Gaddi Nashin for themselves and maintain a guruship lineage originating from Prithi Chand. In Sufism Gaddi Nasheen is also used and it also refers as Trustee and is the successor of a Sufi or Pir and in some instances descendant of a disciple of a Sufi. The Gaddi looks after the shrine and carries out significant rituals in the Dargah and are responsible in looking after the Mazaar Sharif (mausoleum). A trustee is a key person who held and leads the traditional Sufi rituals in Dargah's daily activities and particularly during Urs—(death anniversary).
There are many well known Gaddi Nasheens within the Sufiana Darbar's in Punjab.

See also 

 Guru
 Guru-shishya parampara

References

Ravidassia